Joel Miller may refer to:

Joel M. Miller (born 1943), American politician in the New York State Assembly
Joel Miller (racing driver) (born 1988), American auto racing driver
Joel McKinnon Miller (born 1960), American film and television actor
Joel A. Miller (born 1977), writer, producer, and director
Joel Miller (volleyball) (born 1988), British volleyball player
Joel (The Last of Us) (Joel Miller), protagonist of The Last of Us video game